Johan Alfred Rinell (originally Johansson) born November 27, 1866 in the Rinna parish in Östergötland, Sweden and died July 3, 1941 in Qingdao (Tsingtao), China was a Swedish missionary to China sent by the Baptist Union of Sweden. In China his mission work included philanthropy, disaster relief, postal work, and education.

Early days in Sweden 
Johan Alfred, as he was known, graduated from Stockholm's Bethel Seminary in 1891. During his time at seminary Rinell was encouraged toward mission work by the British missionary John Hudson Taylor who was lecturing at the seminary. After a short period of time as a pastor in Fredrikshald in Norway, where Rinell married Hedvig Jansson, the couple sailed for China in 1893 and arrived in China in 1894.

Journey to China 
On Thursday, November 9, 1893 Johan Alfred and Hedvig set sail on the ship Torsten from Göteborg, Sweden, bound for London, England. For three and a half months they studied English, which would be far more useful than Swedish during their travels and in their future in China.

On Friday, March 2, they made their way to the Port of Tilbury where their ship, the Victoria, was docked.

The ship lifted anchor at 3:30 PM on a beautiful sunny day and sailed toward the Strait of Dover and the English Channel. On board were about 200 people including some other missionaries. Over the course of several weeks they sailed by way of Gibraltar, Malta, Brindisi, Egypt, Aden, Columbo, Singapore, Hong Kong, Shanghai and ended their journey on Friday, April 22 at the port town of Chefoo. Their ocean travel by sea with a few short stops in between lasted 52 days (one month and 21 days).

Early days in China 

From Chefoo the Rinells and the other missionaries traveled 300 kilometer southeast to Kiaochow. The women rode each a "Shen-tse", a large basket suspended by a mule in front and one behind. Each of the men rode a mule. 

They settled in the town of Jiaozhou in Shandong province where they performed mission work for over 55 years.

Johan Alfred and Hedvig had been in China only five months when together with other missionaries had to flee Jiaozhou due to the war between China and Japan in the First Sino-Japanese War (1894-1895). Their lives were threatened enroute by villagers who thought these foreigners were invading Japanese. 

After arriving at the coast they were rescued by the American gunboat USS Charleston and brought to Chefoo (Yantai) and safety.

They had to flee again during the Boxer Rebellion (1895) to Qingdao. The German custom house in Mato in which they were staying was set on fire during their escape. No one was hurt and all made it out safely.

Last days 
Johan Alfred died and was buried in the International Cemetery in Qingdao (Tsingtao) in 1941. A stone memorial raised by the Chinese Christians of Jiaozhou commemorating his work. The International Cemetery was destroyed in 1966 during the chinese Cultural Revolution.

Written works 
Rinell wrote numerous articles and several books including a book about the Boxer Rebellion and persecution of the Christians in China from 1900 to 1901.
  [Boxer Rebellion and the persecution of Christians in China 1900–1901]. Stockholm, 1902. 
  [The Missions Problem: a word of advice to the Swedish Baptist community]. Östersund: Missionsbokhandeln, 1910. 
  [The Mission Mandate and Us]. Stockholm: B.-M:s bokförlag, 1932. 
  [The Swedish Baptists' China mission 1890–1905]. Stockholm: Westerberg, 1906. 
  [Swedish baptist mission in China – a 40-year remembrance]. Stockholm B.-M:s Bokförlags A.-B, 1931.

References 

1866 births
1947 deaths
Christian writers
Protestant missionaries in China
Swedish Baptist missionaries
Swedish evangelicals
Swedish writers
Swedish philanthropists
Philanthropy in China
Postmasters